Up to His Ears ( or in English, "Tribulations of a Chinaman in China") is a 1965 French=Italian international co-production adventure comedy film starring Jean Paul Belmondo and Ursula Andress. It was an indirect sequel to That Man from Rio reuniting many of the same team; directed by Philippe de Broca written by Daniel Boulanger, stunt work by Gil Delamare it was loosely based on the 1879 novel Tribulations of a Chinaman in China by Jules Verne.

Plot
Millionaire Arthur Lempereur is bored with life. He tries to kill himself but fails, then decides to travel to Hong Kong to see if his depression can be cured.

In Hong Kong, Arthur discovers that his money is gone. Mister Goh, his old tutor and a Chinese philosopher, makes him take out a life insurance policy to benefit Alice, Arthur's fiancée, and Mister Goh. Goh promises to kill Arthur for him.

Arthur then meets Alexandrine, an ethnologist and striptease dancer. He decides not to die, and goes to track down Goh before Goh can hire a hitman.

Cast
 Jean Paul Belmondo as Arthur Lempereur
 Ursula Andress as Alexandrine Pinardel
 Jean Rochefort as Leon
 Maria Pacôme as Suzy Ponchabert
 Valérie Lagrange as Alice Ponchabert
 Valéry Inkijinoff as Mr. Goh
 Joe Saïd as Charlie Fallinster
 Mario David as Roquentin
 Paul Préboist as Cornac
 Jess Hahn as Cornelius Ponchabert
 Darry Cowl as Biscoton

Production
In addition to its footage of China, the film contains several minutes of the Agra area in India, including the Taj Mahal, which appears much whiter than it does today. The film also includes approximately 15 minutes of footage of the central area of Kathmandu, Nepal, the nearby Swayambunath hillside temple and more rural mountain areas of Nepal, with the impressive Himalayas as the backdrop.

Filming started under the title Chinese Adventures in China on January 5, 1965 in Nepal. Ursula Andress left for Hong Kong in February 1965. Filming took place in Hong Kong and Paris.

In January 1966, the title was changed to Up to His Ears.

Reception
The film was the tenth-most popular of 1965 in France, after The Sucker, Goldfinger, Thunderball, Gendarme in New York, Mary Poppins, Fantomas Unleashed, God's Thunder, The Wise Guys and Viva Maria!.

References

External links 
 
 
Up to His Ears at Le Film Guide
Up to His Ears at Letterbox DVD
Up to His Ears at Philippe de Broca

French adventure comedy films
1965 films
1960s adventure comedy films
Films scored by Georges Delerue
Films about suicide
Films based on French novels
Films based on works by Jules Verne
Films directed by Philippe de Broca
Films set in Hong Kong
Films set in Nepal
Films shot in Hong Kong
Films shot in Nepal
1960s French-language films
Italian comedy films
Films shot in Lalitpur, Nepal
1960s Italian films
1960s French films